The Altar is the second studio album by American singer and songwriter Banks, released on September 30, 2016, by Harvest Records. Banks collaborated with several producers on the album, including Tim Anderson, Sohn, and Al Shux, with whom she worked on her debut studio album, Goddess. The album received generally positive reviews from critics and became her second top 20 in the United States, peaking at number 17 on the Billboard 200. It spawned four singles: "Fuck with Myself", "Gemini Feed", "Mind Games", and "To the Hilt".

Background
On November 4, 2015, Banks released the single "Better", along with its accompanying music video. Banks toured with The Weeknd for a second time, opening for him on his The Madness Fall Tour across North America from November to December 2015. She announced on June 8, 2016, that she had finished work on her second album. On July 29, Banks revealed that the album would be titled The Altar, along with its cover art and release date.

The lead single from the album, "Fuck with Myself", was released on July 12, 2016. Banks premiered the track on Zane Lowe's Beats 1 radio show, where she said it was the last song she wrote for the album. "There's so many meanings to it", she said of the song. "It could be like, 'I fuck with myself', like, 'I mess with myself more than anybody else.' It could be, 'I fuck with myself', kind of like, 'I'm feeling myself.' It means a lot of different things that I think a lot of people can relate to." The album's second single, "Gemini Feed", premiered on Annie Mac's BBC Radio 1 show on August 2, 2016, and was released digitally the following day. "Mind Games" was released as the third single from the album on August 19, 2016, followed by "To the Hilt" on September 16, 2016. A music video for the song "Trainwreck" premiered on January 18, 2017.

Critical reception

The Altar received generally positive reviews from music critics. At Metacritic, which assigns a normalized rating out of 100 to reviews from mainstream publications, the album received an average score of 70, based on 17 reviews. Jamie Milton of DIY magazine wrote that "when going for the jugular, BANKS combines unbending confidence, warts 'n all detail and gigantic choruses in the same move", adding that "The Altar is very close to being a razor-sharp pop blueprint." George Garner of Q magazine called the album "[s]tunning", stating that "Banks has excelled at transforming accrued romantic scarring into mesmeric songcraft" and "The Altar marks a radical intensification of her talents". Neil Z. Yeung of AllMusic opined that "Banks has strengthened her voice—resolutely and with increased production value—in the two years since her debut Goddess." Shahzaib Hussain of Clash viewed The Altar as "more textured and artful than Goddess, BANKS growing into her role as a writer, upholding the sensual melancholia that characterised her debut."

Sputnikmusic commented that "[t]he confidence on this album is inspired, observable, and the clear result of Banks' growth as a songwriter." Kellan Miller of Drowned in Sound noted that Banks is "even more unfiltered and tenacious on The Altar than she was on Goddess" and that she is "perfectly comfortable in her own skin and artistic abilities, and it shows immensely on The Altar". Writing for Rolling Stone, Maura Johnston concluded that "Banks' list of grievances can get wearying, but the music's dour detail is alluring too." Kate Hutchinson of The Guardian described the album as "claustrophobic with try-hardness" and felt that "Banks doesn't sound empowered, she sounds stretched". In a mixed review, Andrew Paschal of PopMatters expressed that "[t]he high points of The Altar are nearly perfect, but these are outnumbered by a massive middle section  unremarkable, uninspired filler." Katherine St. Asaph of Pitchfork found that "The Altar has a lot in common with Goddess, including its fatal flaw: its attempts to position Banks as edgy or dangerous, despite all musical evidence to the contrary."

Commercial performance
The Altar debuted at number 17 on the US Billboard 200 with 14,220 copies sold in pure album sales. The album debuted at number 24 on the UK Albums Chart, selling 3,229 copies in its first week.

Track listing

Notes
 On the physical release of the album, "Gemini Feed" contains a piano intro and has a length of 3:25. On the digital version, the song does not include the intro, reducing the track's length to 3:06.
  Despite not being credited as a songwriter of "Mind Games" in the album's liner notes, Jenna Andrews is listed as a songwriter by BMI.
  signifies a vocal producer
  signifies an additional producer
  signifies a co-producer

Sample credits
 "Poltergeist" contains a sample from "Hold On Jus' a Li'l While Longer" by Sounds of Blackness.

Personnel
Credits adapted from the liner notes of The Altar.

Musicians
 Banks – vocals
 Edmund Finnis – string arrangements 
 Chris Spilfogel – string conducting 
 The Section Quartet 
 Daphne Chen – violin
 Eric Gorfain – violin
 Leah Katz – viola
 Richard Dodd – cello
 Gary Hines – sample arrangement

Technical

 Sohn – production ; recording ; additional production ; engineering, mixing 
 Chris Spilfogel – vocal recording, vocal production ; recording 
 Seth Perez – vocal recording assistance, vocal production assistance ; recording ; recording assistance 
 Manny Marroquin – mixing 
 Chris Galland – mix engineering 
 Jeff Jackson – mix engineering assistance 
 Robin Florent – mix engineering assistance 
 Al Shux – production, recording 
 Aron Forbes – vocal recording ; recording ; additional production ; co-production 
 Tim Anderson – production ; executive production
 Leggy – mixing 
 DJ Dahi – production ; co-production 
 Rich Costey – mixing 
 Martin Cooke – mix engineering assistance 
 Nicolas Fourier – mix engineering assistance 
 Mario Bogatta – mix assistance 
 DannyBoyStyles – production 
 Ben Billions – production 
 The Anmls – co-production 
 Danny Schofield – recording 
 Sean Tallman – mixing 
 John Hill – production 
 Rob Cohen – recording 
 Banks – executive production
 Pete Lyman – mastering

Artwork
 Thomas Whiteside – photography
 Sydney Nichols – design

Charts

Release history

Notes

References

2016 albums
Albums produced by Al Shux
Albums produced by DJ Dahi
Albums produced by John Hill (record producer)
Albums recorded at Westlake Recording Studios
Banks (singer) albums
Harvest Records albums